Saw Sit of Mrauk-U (Arakanese:စောစစ်; was the first queen of the Mrauk U Dynasty of Arakan and last chief queen consort of the Launggyet Dynasty of Arakan.

Since foundation of Mrauk U, she was known as the Hmauk Taw Min Mon Mibara (မှောက်တော် မင်းမွန် မိဖုရား, "Queen Saw Mon of the Western Gate). She was married to King Saw Mon, who was the last king of Launggyet before its conquest by the Burmans and the first king of Mrauk U after its the restoration of the Arakanese throne.

Early Life 

The princess was likely born around during 1380s in the royal capital, Launggyet. Her ancestry likely descended from King Min Hti through his first queen Saw Sit I of Launggyet, who had 3 children together with her. Saw Sit II is likely to be great granddaughter of Saw Sit I.

Marriage to Min Saw Mon 

Princess Saw Sit married the Prince Narameikhla on April 1404 of their coronation in the royal palace.

Bibliography

References 

Chief queens consort of Launggyet
Chief queens consort of Mrauk-U
Queens consort of Mrauk-U
Burmese people of Rakhine descent